The 2011–12 Buffalo Bulls men's basketball team represented the University at Buffalo during the 2011–12 NCAA Division I men's basketball season. The Bulls, led by 13th year head coach Reggie Witherspoon, played their home games at Alumni Arena and were members of the East Division of the Mid-American Conference. They finished the season 20–11, 12–4 in MAC play to finish in second place in the East Division. They lost in the semifinals of the MAC tournament to Ohio. The Bulls received an invite to the 2012 CollegeInsider.com Postseason Tournament, where they defeated American in the first round before losing to Oakland in the second round.

Roster

Schedule

|-
!colspan=9 style=| Regular season

|-
!colspan=9 style=|MAC tournament

|-
!colspan=9 style=|CollegeInsider.com tournament

References

Buffalo Bulls men's basketball seasons
Buffalo
Buffalo
Buffalo Bulls
Buffalo Bulls